Symmachia accusatrix is a butterfly species present in Mexico, Ecuador, Colombia, Brazil and French Guiana.

See also 
 List of butterflies of French Guiana
 List of Lepidoptera of Honduras
 List of butterflies of Mexico

References

External links

 

accusatrix
Butterflies of Central America
Butterflies of North America
Riodinidae of South America
Fauna of Brazil
Arthropods of Colombia
Fauna of Ecuador
Lepidoptera of French Guiana
Butterflies described in 1851